Stare Kiejkuty  is a village in the administrative district of Gmina Szczytno, within Szczytno County, Warmian-Masurian Voivodeship, in northern Poland. 

It is an old small village lying near road DK58, between two lakes: Wałpusz and Starokiejkuckie, popular vacation spots in the summertime with many vacation properties.

References

Stare Kiejkuty